Phantasmagoria was a visual kei rock band formed in November 2004 in Osaka, Japan by Kisaki, the executive of Under Code Production, a popular independent label.

History
Phantasmagoria was formed in November 2004 and their first single "Material Pain" was released in  the music magazine Shoxx on December 21 of the same year. The following day the group released its first Maxi-single, "Moonlight Revival".

Phantasmagoria was featured on the cover of well-known visual kei magazine Cure, one month after their formation, becoming one of the fastest-rising indie bands to appear on the cover of a magazine. 

During the 2010 Under Code Production's New Year's live, Phantasmagoria was once again revived to perform. Along with their revival, the band released a mini-album and a single which contained songs the band had written while they were active but never released. The EP, entitled Seeds of Brain, contained four new songs, whereas the new single, "Diamond Dust", contained the title track and an instrumental version. In an interview with Shoxx magazine, Kisaki stated "Although we created the songs a while back, we never released them. We included those for hardcore fans who want to listen to all our songs. This is our last release; although I'm not sure if that sounds convincing [grins]. But this time around it's really the end." On April 5, the band had their last official live and Kisaki announced his newest band, "凛 -the end of corruption world-,"  the day after. As of now, Phantasmagoria's last release is another collection of unreleased songs entitled Actuality, which was released in two versions on June 16, 2010.

Members

Riku (戮) – Lead vocals, keyboards
He was the vocalist, born in Hyōgo Prefecture on January 3, 1978. He was previously in the bands Kawon and Hiskarea and went under the name Kenji (研二).
Jun (JUN) – Lead guitar, backing vocals
He was a guitarist, born on November 17, 1983, in Kobe. He was previously in the bands Se'lavy and Mar'derayla (マーディレイラ).
Iori (伊織) – Rhythm guitar, backing vocals
He was a guitarist, born on January 10, 1984, in Kobe. He was previously in the bands Se'lavy and Mar'derayla (マーディレイラ).
Kisaki (KISAKI) – Bass, keyboards, synthesizers, leader
He was the bassist and bandleader, born on March 10, 1976, in Kainan, Wakayama. His previous bands include Levia, Laybial, Shey≠de, De=prive, Stella Maria, Haijinkurobarazoku (廃人黒薔薇族), La:Sadie's, Mirage, and Syndrome.
Matoi (纏) – Drums, percussion
He was the drummer, born on September 25, 1981, in Osaka. He was previously in the bands Kawon and Hiskarea.

Discography

Singles
"Material Pain" (December 21, 2004)
"Moonlight Revival" (December 22, 2004)
"Never Rebellion" (June 1, 2005) Oricon Singles Weekly Chart Top Position: 83
"Never Rebellion – Fool's Mate Edition" (July 1, 2005)
"Mikansei to Guilt" (未完成とギルト, October 19, 2005) Oricon Singles Weekly Chart Top Position: 22
"Kousoukyoku (Variant Jihad)"(神創曲～Variant Jihad～, January 25, 2006) Oricon Singles Weekly Chart Top Position: 80
"Kyousoukyoku (Cruel Crucible)"(狂想曲～Cruel Crucible～, February 22, 2006) Oricon Singles Weekly Chart Top Position: 90
"Gensoukyoku (Eternal Silence)"(幻想曲～Eternal Silence～, March 26, 2006) Oricon Singles Weekly Chart Top Position: 75
"Under the Veil" (December 13, 2006) Oricon Singles Weekly Chart Top Position: 77
"Vain" (February 14, 2007)
"Kisaki Chronicle" (June 21, 2007)
"Kami Uta" (神歌, July 18, 2007) Oricon Singles Weekly Chart Top Position: 32
"Vanish..." (August 31, 2008)
"Diamond Dust" (March 10, 2010)
"Actuality" (June 16, 2010)

Albums
Splendor of Sanctuary (US Release: October 21, 2005)
Synthesis Songs (September 20, 2006)
Sign of Fragment (December 20, 2006)
Subjective or Ideal (December 20, 2006)
Requiem: Floral Edition (September 5, 2007)
Requiem: Funeral Edition (September 5, 2007)
No Imagination (October 10, 2007)
Dejavu: Sanctuary Of Revival (August 20, 2008)
Seeds of Brain (March 10, 2010)
Actuality (June 16, 2010)
Wailing Wall (October 26, 2011)

DVDs
Kindling Vol.1 (March 1, 2005)
Kansai Seiatsu 2004~2005 (関西制圧2004～2005, April 6, 2005)
Geneizou I: After the Moonlight Revival (幻影像I～after the moonlight Revival～, April 6, 2005)
Yoshigen Yuukoujouyaku (四次元友好条約, July 1, 2005)
Geneizou II: Sin Screen Film (幻影像2～SIN SCREEN FILM～, August 10, 2005)
Geneizou III: For Degradation Crowd (幻影像3～for degradation crowd～, December 14, 2005)
Survivor's Guilt: 2005.10.21&22 USA Houston,Texas Park Plaza Hotel Reliant (June 21, 2006)
Territory of Divine: 2006.3.27 Shibuya-AX (July 25, 2006)
Japanesque Rock Collectionz Cure DVD Vol.01 (September 27, 2006)
Geneizou IV: Chronology Revelation (幻影像4～chronology revelation～, October 18, 2007)
Creatures in Imagination  (November 15, 2006)
Black-Veil Before Christmas: 2006.12.17 La Foret Museum Roppongi (February 21, 2007)
Geneizou V: Under the Veil (幻影像5～under the veil～, February 28, 2007)
At the End of the Rest Period: 2007.2.23 Shibuya-AX (April 25, 2007)
Shinki: Graduation & Departure (May 30, 2007)
Eclipse of Myth: 2007.8.31 Osaka Kokusai Kouryuu Senta (-Eclipse of Myth- ~2007.8.31 大阪国際交流センター~, August 31, 2007)
Reincarnation: Geneizou Kanzenban (REINCARNATION～幻影像完全盤～, September 5, 2007)
Crystal Finale: 2007.8.27 Tokyo Shibuya-AX (-CRYSTAL FINALE-～2007.8.27 東京SHIBUYA-AX～, October 31, 2007)
Forbidden: Insanity Of The Underworld (November 20, 2008)
History of Phantasmagoria 2004-2008 (December 24, 2008)
Diamond Dust in Truth  (June 26, 2010)
Wailing Wall 2004-2010  (October 26, 2011)

References

 Phantasmagoria Interview SHOXX Vol.206 official English Translation at musicJAPAN+

External links 
  

Gan-Shin artists
Visual kei musical groups
Musical groups from Osaka
Musical groups established in 2004
Musical groups disestablished in 2007
Musical groups reestablished in 2008
Musical groups reestablished in 2010
Japanese alternative rock groups